General transcription factor II-I repeat domain-containing protein 1 is a protein that in humans is encoded by the GTF2IRD1 gene.

The protein encoded by this gene contains five GTF2I-like repeats and each repeat possesses a potential helix-loop-helix (HLH) motif. It may have the ability to interact with other HLH-proteins and function as a transcription factor or as a positive transcriptional regulator under the control of Retinoblastoma protein. This gene is deleted in Williams syndrome, a multisystem developmental disorder caused by deletion of multiple genes at 7q11.23. Alternative splicing of this gene generates at least 2 transcript variants.

References

Further reading